Tabor Mountain Ski Resort, also known as Tabor Mountain Alpine Resort, is a ski resort located  east of Prince George, British Columbia, Canada, adjacent to BC Hwy 16 on Mount Tabor.

The resort has one triple chair, with a handle tow in the lessons area.

 Vertical drop: 255 m (836 ft)
 Base elevation: 785 m (2,575 ft)
 Top elevation: 1,040 m (3,412 ft)
 Skiable acreage: 73 hectares (180 acres)
 Number of winter runs: 21
 Difficulty: Novice – 25%, Intermediate – 50%, Advanced – 25%
 Number of lifts: 1 triple chair, 1 handle tow for lessons
 Lift capacity: 1,450 skiers per hour

See also
Purden Ski Village
Hart Highlands Ski Hill

References
Tabor Mountain Ski Resort 
Profile at Britishcolumbia.com 

Ski areas and resorts in British Columbia